Niklas Axelsson (born 15 May 1972) is a Swedish former professional road racing cyclist. Axelsson finished sixth during the 1999 Giro d'Italia and third in the 2000 edition of Giro di Lombardia. He is banned from sports for life for doping.

Doping
Axelsson tested positive for EPO in the 2001 UCI Road World Championships in Lisbon and later admitted his guilt. He was suspended for four years by the Swedish Cycling Federation (SCF) but made an early comeback in 2004. He was diagnosed with testicular cancer in 2007 but made a complete recovery.

In 2010 it was found that his September 2009 A sample was positive for EPO. On 7 July 2010, the B sample was deemed positive and the Swedish Cycling Federation suspended Axelsson for life.

See also
 List of doping cases in cycling

References

External links

Expressen: Fälld för doping - nu bryter han tystnaden 

1972 births
Swedish male cyclists
Swedish sportspeople in doping cases
Doping cases in cycling
People from Mora Municipality
Living people
Sportspeople from Dalarna County